Seckford is a surname. Notable people with the surname include:

 Charles Seckford (1551–1592), English politician
 Thomas Seckford (1515–1587), English politician